Fu Yong (born 4 January 1978) is a Chinese former swimmer who competed in the 2000 Summer Olympics.

References

1978 births
Living people
Chinese male backstroke swimmers
Olympic swimmers of China
Swimmers at the 2000 Summer Olympics
Asian Games medalists in swimming
Asian Games gold medalists for China
Asian Games silver medalists for China
Swimmers at the 1994 Asian Games
Swimmers at the 1998 Asian Games
Medalists at the 1998 Asian Games
20th-century Chinese people